James Walter McCord Jr. (January 26, 1924 – June 15, 2017) was an American CIA officer, later head of security for President Richard Nixon's 1972 reelection campaign. He was involved as an electronics expert in the burglaries which precipitated the Watergate scandal.

Career
McCord was born in Waurika, Oklahoma. He served as a bombardier with the rank of second lieutenant in the Army Air Forces during World War II. He briefly attended Baylor University before receiving a B.B.A. from the University of Texas at Austin in 1949. In 1965, he received an M.S. in international affairs from George Washington University. After beginning his career at the Federal Bureau of Investigation (FBI), McCord worked for the Central Intelligence Agency (CIA), ultimately ascending to the GS-15 directorship of the Agency's Office of Security.

For a period of time, he was in charge of physical security at the Agency's Langley headquarters. L. Fletcher Prouty, a former colonel in the United States Air Force, claimed then-Director of Central Intelligence Allen Dulles introduced McCord to him as "my top man.".

In 1961, under his direction, a counter-intelligence program was launched against the Fair Play for Cuba Committee. He also held the rank of lieutenant colonel in the United States Air Force Reserve.

Watergate scandal
Shortly after resigning from the CIA, McCord was interviewed and then hired by Jack Caulfield in January 1972 "for strict, solely defensive security work at the Republican National Committee (RNC) and the Committee to Re-Elect the President (CRP)." Some of the money from this contract came from the RNC, which was led by Bob Dole who was called "Nixon's Doberman pinscher" and a Republican Party fixer, and was used during the Watergate scandal. He and four other accomplices were arrested during the second break-in to the Democratic National Committee's headquarters at the Watergate complex on June 17, 1972. The arrests led to the Watergate scandal and Nixon's resignation.

McCord asserted that the White House knew of and approved the break ins, and proceeded to cover up the incident. Because of McCord's statements, the Watergate investigators pursued many more leads.

McCord was one of the first men convicted in the Watergate criminal trial; on eight counts of conspiracy, burglary and wiretapping. On March 21, 1973, three days before sentencing, McCord, after speaking to a probation officer and thus surmising that he might be facing a lengthy prison sentence, submitted a letter to the judge in the case, John Sirica, in which he claimed that he and the other defendants had committed perjury in their trial and that there was pressure from higher up for them to have done so. On March 23, the day of the sentencing, Sirica sentenced the other defendants provisionally, citing a statute that allowed for maximum sentences of several decades as a means to "research" more information needed for the final sentencing. This was a means to pressure the defendants into revealing more information about the burglary. McCord's sentencing was postponed until June and then postponed again. Finally, in November 1973, McCord was sentenced to from one to five years  and began serving his sentence in March 1975, but was released after only four months because of his cooperation in the Watergate investigation.

Post-Watergate
After serving four months in prison, McCord continued with McCord Associates, which was his own security firm located in Rockville, retiring later to Pennsylvania.

McCord died at the age of 93 from pancreatic cancer on June 15, 2017, at his home in Douglassville, Pennsylvania. His death was not reported in local and national news  outlets until 2019.

McCord was portrayed in All the President's Men, the 1976 film retelling the events of the Watergate scandal, by Richard Herd.

McCord was portrayed in Gaslit, the 2022 television adaptation of the podcast Slow Burn by Chris Bauer.

See also
 G. Gordon Liddy
 E. Howard Hunt
 All the President's Men by Carl Bernstein and Bob Woodward

References

Bibliography

Further reading 
McCord wrote a book about his connection with the Watergate burglary:

External links
James McCord testifying at the Watergate Hearings WETA-TV Public Television, 1973 Watergate Hearings

1924 births
2017 deaths
People from Berks County, Pennsylvania
People from Waurika, Oklahoma
Military personnel from Oklahoma
Writers from Oklahoma
American perjurers
American spies
Baylor University alumni
Elliott School of International Affairs alumni
Members of the Committee for the Re-Election of the President
Watergate Seven
People convicted in the Watergate scandal
CIA agents convicted of crimes
Deaths from pancreatic cancer
Deaths from cancer in Pennsylvania
Virginia Republicans
Pennsylvania Republicans
United States Army Air Forces personnel of World War II
United States Army Air Forces officers
United States Air Force colonels
United States Air Force reservists